Eugenio Giuseppe Togliatti (3 November 1890 – 5 October 1977) was an Italian mathematician, the brother of politician Palmiro Togliatti. He was a researcher at the ETH Zurich from 1924 to 1926. He discovered Togliatti surfaces.

References

1890 births
1977 deaths
People from Orbassano
+20th-century Italian mathematicians
Algebraic geometers
Differential geometers